The Yemeni Civil War was a civil war fought between the two Yemeni forces of the pro-union northern and the socialist separatist southern Yemeni states and their supporters. The war resulted in the defeat of the southern armed forces, the reunification of Yemen, and the flight into exile of many Yemeni Socialist Party (YSP) leaders and other separatists.

Background 
South Yemen had witnessed 2 civil wars that led to regime changes in the 1980s. As a result, serious moves toward reconciliation and unification began. And in December 1989, the president of North Yemen and South Yemen signed a draft constitution and agreed to a one-year timetable for unification.

Approval for the union was overwhelming in the South, but the northern Muslim Brotherhood (Al-Islah) objected due to the new constitutional clause making Islamic law "a principal source of legislation" rather than the sole source. Eventually the YAR's parliament approved the constitution and, the Republic of Yemen (ROY) was declared on 22 May 1990 with Ali Abdullah Saleh becoming president and Ali Salem al Beidh Vice President. Greater Yemen had been politically united for the first time in centuries. Yemen held its first parliamentary elections on April 27, 1993, which confirmed the southerner fears. Former President of South Yemen, Ali Salim Al-Beidh's party (YSP) won only 54 of the 301 parliament seats, while former president of Northern Yemen Ali Abdullah Saleh's GPC took 122 seats and a northern Islamist-tribal alliance, Al-Islah, captured 62 seats. Saleh, Beidh, and Attas retained their positions but Al-Islah's influential leader, the Sheikh Abdullah ibn Husayn al-Ahmar of the Hashid tribal confederation, became speaker of the parliament. The former 50–50 split between the GPC and YSP became an uneven three-way partnership.

Relations between Saleh and many Left-wing politicians soured over the next years. The President eventually began to enlist Islamists to weaken his opponents, and allowed them to build up a presence in the country. Jihadists consequently assassinated several Southern communists.

Vice President Ali Salem al Beidh withdrew to Aden in August 1993 and said he would not return to the government until his grievances were addressed. These included northern violence against his Yemeni Socialist Party, as well as the economic marginalization of the south. Negotiations to end the political deadlock dragged on into 1994. The government of Prime Minister Haidar Abu Bakr al-Attas, the former PDRY Prime Minister, became ineffective due to political infighting.

An accord between northern and southern leaders was signed in Amman, Jordan on 20 February 1994, but this could not stop the crisis. During these tensions, both the northern and southern armies–which had never integrated–gathered on their respective frontiers.

Events 
On 27 April, a major tank battle erupted in Amran, near Sana'a. Both sides accused the other of starting it. On 4 May, the southern air force bombed San'a and other areas in the north; the northern air force responded by bombing Aden. President Saleh declared a 30-day state of emergency, and foreign nationals began evacuating the country. Vice President al-Beidh was officially dismissed. South Yemen also fired Scud missiles into San'a, killing dozens of civilians. Prime Minister Haidar Abu Bakr al-Attas was dismissed on May 10 after appealing for outside forces to help end the war.

On 20 May 1994, northern forces claimed to have overrun Al Anad Air Base, one of the key entry points to Aden. Later that day, President Saleh announced a three-day ceasefire for the occasion of the Eid al-Adha Muslim holiday.

Southern leaders seceded and declared the Democratic Republic of Yemen (DRY) on 21 May 1994. Saleh responded by calling on Islamists to support his cause, with several factions coming to the aid of the North.

No international government recognized the DRY. In mid-May, northern forces began a push toward Aden. The key city of Ataq, which allowed access to the country's oil fields, was seized on May 24. The United Nations Security Council adopted Resolution 924 calling for an end to the fighting and a cease-fire. A cease-fire was called on 6 June, but lasted only six hours; concurrent talks to end the fighting in Cairo collapsed as well. Northern troops and Jihadist forces led by Tariq al-Fadhli entered Aden on 4 July, factually ending the conflict. Supporters of Ali Nasir Muhammad greatly assisted military operations against the secessionists. After Aden's fall, most resistance quickly collapsed and top southern military and political leaders fled into exile.

In general, the civil war was a short conflict but fiercely fought. Almost all of the actual fighting in the 1994 civil war occurred in the southern part of the country, despite air and missile attacks against cities and major installations in the north. Southerners sought support from neighbouring states and may have received military assistance from Saudi Arabia and Oman, which felt threatened by a united Yemen The United States repeatedly called for a cease-fire and a return to the negotiating table. Various attempts, including by a UN special envoy and Russia, were unsuccessful to effect a cease-fire.

Aftermath 

President Saleh had control over all of Yemen. A general amnesty was declared, except for 16 southern figures; legal cases against four — Ali Salem al Beidh, Haidar Abu Bakr al-Attas, Abd Al-Rahman Ali Al-Jifri, and Salih Munassar Al-Siyali — were prepared, for misappropriation of official funds.

YSP leaders within Yemen reorganized following the civil war and elected a new politburo in July 1994. However, much of its influence had been destroyed in the war. President Ali Abdallah Saleh was elected by Parliament on 1 October 1994 to a 5-year term. However, he remained in office until 2012.

As of 2007, a group called the South Yemen Movement calling for the secession of the south and the re-establishment of an independent southern state has grown in strength across many parts of south Yemen, leading to an increase in tensions and often violent clashes.

See also
 List of modern conflicts in the Middle East
 South Yemen Movement
 South Yemen insurgency

Notes

References

Works cited

External links
Yemeni Civil War - 1994
The Birth of Modern Yemen - The outbreak of war 

Rebellions in Yemen
Wars involving Yemen
Separatism in Yemen
Civil War
Arab separatism
Proxy wars
Yemeni Socialist Party